HSwMS Visby (K31) is the lead ship of the s. It was created as a stealth ship, and underwent a decade long testing phase before it entered service with the Swedish Navy.

Design and description

HSwMS Visby is the lead ship of the s. It was built by Kockums at the Karlskrona naval base, and was the first of four vessels of the class which are designed for coastal warfare.

The hull of the vessel is made of carbon fiber reinforced plastic, a stealth technology, in order to make the vessel difficult to detect by other forces. A minimum of external equipment is stored outside of the vessel, with equipment such as liferafts being stored inside the hull. This hull also reduces the weight of the vessel by around half. It was intended to be radar silent until it moves within  of an enemy vessel, resulting in designer John Nilsson saying of it, "Naval officers fall in love with [this] ship. It's not classically beautiful. In fact it looks like a lunchbox. But it has better maneuverability and can achieve that level of stealth."

Construction and career
Visby completed sea trials in 2004.
The ship underwent a further eight years of tests by the Swedish Defence Procurement Agency, before being delivered to the Navy in late 2012. These tests included the firing of the RBS15 Mk2 AShM, which took place in July 2012. In October 2014, Visby was amongst the Swedish vessels patrolling in an exercise for finding the source of "foreign underwater activity" which was rumoured to be a Russian submarine, identified by distress call. This rumour was denied by the Swedish authorities, who described it as an "intelligence operation".

References

External links

 FMV—Official homepage
 Kockums—Official homepage
 Swedish navy page on the Visby trials 

Visby-class corvettes
Corvettes of Sweden
2000 ships
Ships built in Karlskrona